A record of the heights of the presidents of the United States and presidential candidates is useful for evaluating what role, if any, height plays in presidential elections.  Some observers have noted that the taller of the two major-party candidates tends to prevail, and argue this is due to the public's preference for taller candidates.

Joe Biden, the current president, is  according to a physical examination summary from February 2023.

U.S. presidents by height order

Electoral success as a function of height

Folk wisdom about U.S. presidential politics holds that the taller of the two major-party candidates always wins or almost always wins since the advent of the televised presidential debate.

There are more data if the relationship of electoral success to height difference starts from the year 1900, rather than from the beginning of televised debates. In the thirty-one presidential elections between 1900 and 2020, twenty-one of the winning candidates have been taller than their opponents, while nine have been shorter, and one was the same height. On average the winner was  taller than the loser.

However, it may be argued that drawing the line at any date ignores the fact that pictorial depictions of presidential hopefuls have been available to the American public at large well before debates were televised. Stereographs were widely used as a form of photojournalism for historical events (including political events) by the 1870s. Cutting off the date at 1900 excludes the seven presidential elections immediately preceding where the taller candidate won only once (which, when included, partially equalizes the ratio to 22 taller vs. 14 shorter winners between 1872 and 2020). Considering that political cartoons and text-based descriptions of candidates have been a staple of American politics since the beginning, one could argue that Americans have always been able to compare candidates by height. Thus, upon including all elections until 2020 where the heights of each candidate are known, the average height of the winner above the loser drops to a mere ; this average height difference becomes little more than a round-off error—a mere —when excluding the 2016 election, in which gender not only accounted for the height difference, but was likely the greater physical distinction between the two main candidates than height.

The claims about taller candidates winning almost all modern presidential elections is still pervasive, however. Examples of such views include:

 In Ray Bradbury's 1953 dystopian novel Fahrenheit 451, when Mildred and her friends talk about the success of one presidential candidate over the other in a recent election, they talk only about the attractiveness of the winning candidate over the loser. One of their points is "You just don't go running a little short man like that against a tall man."
 A 1988 article in the Los Angeles Times fashion section about a haberdasher devoted to clothing shorter men included a variation of the tale: "Stern says he just learned that Dukakis is 5 feet, 8 inches. 'Did you know,' he adds, noticeably disappointed, 'that since 1900 the taller of the two candidates always wins?'"
 A 1997 book called How to Make Anyone Fall in Love with You discusses the issue in a section about the importance of height: "What about height? One assumes the taller the better, because our culture venerates height. In fact, practically every president elected in the United States since 1900 was the taller of the two candidates."
 A chapter titled "Epistemology at the Core of Postmodernism" in the 2002 book Telling the Truth:  Evangelizing Postmodernisms makes this observation:  "I remember the subversive effect the observation had on me that in every U.S. presidential race, the taller of the two candidates had been elected. It opened up space for a counterdiscourse to the presumed rationality of the electoral process."
 A 1975 book called First Impressions: The Psychology of Encountering Others notes: "Elevator Shoes, Anyone? One factor which has a far-reaching influence on how people are perceived, at least in American society, is height. From 1900 to 1968 the man elected U.S. president was always the taller of the two candidates. (Richard Nixon was slightly shorter than George McGovern.)"
 A 1978 book titled The Psychology of Person Identification states:  "They also say that every President of the USA elected since the turn of the [20th] century has been the taller of the two candidates (Jimmy Carter being an exception)."
 A 1999 book, Survival of the Prettiest by Nancy Etcoff, repeated a version of the legend in a section on the power of heights: "... Since 1776 only [two Presidents,] James Madison and Benjamin Harrison[,] have been below-average height. The easiest way to predict the winner in a United States election is to bet on the taller man: in this century you would have had an unbroken string of hits until 1972 when Richard Nixon beat George McGovern."

A comparison of the heights of the winning presidential candidate with the losing candidate from each election since 1788 is provided below to evaluate such views.

Comparative table of heights of United States presidential candidates

Notes:

** Lost the House of Representatives vote, but received the most popular votes and a plurality of electoral votes; however, not the majority needed to win.

† Ran unopposed

Extremes

The tallest president elected to office was Abraham Lincoln. Portrait artist Francis Bicknell Carpenter supplies the information for Lincoln:

Mr. Lincoln's height was six feet three and three-quarter inches "in his stocking-feet." He stood up one day, at the right of my large canvas, while I marked his exact height upon it.

A disputed theory holds that Lincoln's height is the result of the genetic condition multiple endocrine neoplasia type 2b (MEN2B); see medical and mental health of Abraham Lincoln.

Only slightly shorter than Lincoln was Lyndon B. Johnson, the tallest president who originally entered office without being elected directly.

The shortest president elected to office was James Madison; the shortest president to originally enter the office by means other than election is tied between Millard Fillmore and Harry S. Truman (both were ).

The largest height difference between two presidential candidates (out of the candidates whose heights are known) was in the 1860 election, when Abraham Lincoln stood  taller than opponent Stephen A. Douglas. The second-largest difference was in the 1812 election, with DeWitt Clinton standing  taller than incumbent James Madison.

Notes

References

External links
 Stats: Does the taller man always win?
 The Straight Dope: Does the taller candidate always win the election?
 Presidential Timber Tends To Be Tall

Lists relating to the United States presidency
Lists of candidates for President of the United States
United States presidential candidates